Boneh-ye Fakhr-e Pain (also Romanized as Boneh-ye Fākhr-e Pā’īn) is a village in Howmeh-ye Gharbi Rural District, in the Central District of Ramhormoz County, Khuzestan Province, Iran. At the 2006 census, its population was 35, in 8 families.

References 

Populated places in Ramhormoz County